Subdivisions of Austria:

 locality
 Cadastral community
 municipality
 District (Austria)
 States of Austria
 NUTS statistical regions of Austria
 ISO 3166-2:AT
 Seven telephone areas: see Telephone numbers in Austria

 
Austria